James Cowgill (April 2, 1848 – January 20, 1922) was  State Treasurer of Missouri  from 1908 to 1912 and Mayor of Kansas City, Missouri from 1918 until he died in office.

Biography
Cowgill was born April 2, 1848, on a farm in Henry County, Indiana.  In 1864, He joined the Union Army in the American Civil War. He was part of the 9th Indiana Infantry and served until the end of the war in 1865.

He moved to a Caldwell County, Missouri farm in 1868.  He was elected presiding Judge of the Caldwell County Court in 1882 and in 1890.  He represented the county in the Missouri General Assembly.

Cowgill moved to Kansas City in 1893 and was elected city treasurer in 1900. He was president of the Pioneer Life Insurance Company. After serving as State Treasurer, he was Chairman of the Democratic State Central Committee in 1916.  He was member of the Kansas City Board of Elections in 1917 and elected mayor in 1918.  He died at his desk.

References

1848 births
1922 deaths
Mayors of Kansas City, Missouri
State treasurers of Missouri
Missouri Democrats
People from Henry County, Indiana
People from Caldwell County, Missouri